Natalya Nikolayevna Fateyeva (born 23 December 1934) is a Soviet and Russian film actress and television presenter. She has appeared in more than fifty films since 1956. People's Artist of the RSFSR (1980).

Biography
Natalya was born and brought up in Kharkiv. Her father was a Soviet military officer, and her mother was manager of a local fashion shop. She studied acting at Kharkiv Acting College during the 1950s and was briefly married to a student classmate, but soon she divorced the student and moved to Moscow. There, after meeting Sergei Gerasimov, Fateyeva was admitted to the graduate year at VGIK acting school. 

She was voted "the most beautiful Soviet actress" in the early 60s by readers of the Soviet film magazine "Ekran" and other publications.

Natalya Fateyeva was married and divorced three times. She has two children. She is living in Moscow, Russia.   

In 2014 and 2022, she condemned both the annexation of Crimea and the Russian invasion of Ukraine.

Filmography

References

External links
 

1934 births
20th-century Russian actresses
21st-century Russian actresses
Living people
Actors from Kharkiv
Gerasimov Institute of Cinematography alumni
Honored Artists of the RSFSR
People's Artists of the RSFSR
Recipients of the Nika Award
Recipients of the Order of Honour (Russia)
Russian people of Ukrainian descent
Solidarnost politicians
Union of Right Forces politicians
Russian activists against the 2022 Russian invasion of Ukraine
Russian film actresses
Russian voice actresses
Russian women television presenters
Soviet film actresses
Soviet television presenters
Soviet voice actresses